Singer for Singer is Misia's sixth studio album and first conceptual one,  released on December 8, 2004, only ten months after Mars & Roses. It sold 167,518 copies in its first week and peaked at #3. Singer for Singer features collaborations with Toshinobu Kubota, Fumiya Fujī, Glay, Chara, Kazufumi Miyazawa (The Boom), Eisho Higa (Begin) and Kōji Tamaki.

The album is certified Platinum for shipment of 250,000 copies.

Track listing

Charts

Oricon sales chart

References

External links
MISIA | Sony Music

2004 albums
Misia albums
Japanese-language albums
Avex Trax albums